Alyssa Black is an American politician serving as a member of the Vermont House of Representatives for the Chittenden-8-3 district. Elected in November 2020, she assumed office on January 6, 2021.

Early life and education 
Born and raised in Fredonia, New York, Black graduated from Fredonia High School. She attended the University of Vermont.

Career 
Outside of politics, Black works as a healthcare administrator for a medical practice in Essex, Vermont. She was elected to the Vermont House of Representatives in November 2020 and assumed office on January 6, 2021.

Personal life 
Black and her husband, Rob, had three children. In 2018, Black's son, Andrew, committed suicide the same day he purchased a handgun. Since then, Black has advocated for legislation that would require waiting periods between firearm purchases and possession.

References 

Living people
Democratic Party members of the Vermont House of Representatives
Women state legislators in Vermont
People from Fredonia, New York
Year of birth missing (living people)